Billy Liar is a 1959 novel by Keith Waterhouse.

Billy Liar may also refer to:
Billy Liar (film), a 1963 film directed by John Schlesinger
Billy Liar (TV series), a 1973–1974 British sitcom
"Billy Liar" (song), a song by The Decemberists from their 2003 album Her Majesty the Decemberists
Billy Liar (band), an acoustic punk/folk band